José Juan Bigas Luna (19 March 1946 – 5 April 2013) was a Catalan film director, designer and artist. His films are typically characterised by a strong emphasis on the erotic, often related to food, something for which he admitted a strong passion. His work often explores and parodies clichés of Spanish identity, but he had an international career and has made films in Spanish, Catalan, Italian, French and English.

Biography

Early career
Luna was born on March 19, 1946 in Barcelona.

He began his professional career working in interior and industrial design,  creating the Estudio Gris with Carlos Riart in 1969. His designs during the 1960s showed a great interest in conceptual art and the emerging visual technologies.  He won the Gold Delta Award ADI/FAD 1970.

He moved into movie making in the 1970s, making low-budget shorts with erotic themes. In 1976 he shot his first feature film, Tattoo, achieving notoriety in 1978 with the sexually explicit Bilbao, which was selected for the Cannes Film Festival.

Organic farm
In 1986 he retired to Tarragona in order to devote his time to painting, while raising his three daughters. He and his wife Celia ran an organic farm which produced wine, ham and other organic products. Luna enjoyed the life of a bon vivant.

Return to film
In 1990 the producer Andrés Vicente Gómez persuaded him to return to cinema and entrusted to him the direction of Las edades de Lulú (The Ages of Lulu), an erotic drama about a young woman exploring extreme sexual practices. This was a commercial success. Without abandoning his dedication to painting and photography, reflected in numerous exhibitions, he began the well-known "Iberian Trilogy" with Jamón Jamón ("Ham, Ham", 1992), Huevos de Oro ("Golden Balls", 1993) and La teta y la luna ("The Tit and the Moon", 1994). These films "explored the darkest depths of eroticism and stereotypical Spanish machismo." Jamón Jamón, which launched the careers of both Javier Bardem and the 16-year-old Penélope Cruz was a major international success and won the Silver Lion at Venice in 1992. Cruz returned in Volavérunt (1999), a film about the relationship between Francisco Goya and the Duchess of Alba.

Subsequently, with the short film for the internet Collar de Moscas (2001), he revived his interest in avant-garde experimentation and audiovisual formats and at the same time he discovered a vocation for the investigation of digital cinema after the creation of the Taller Bigas Luna project with Catalina Pons in 1999. The experience in the Taller introduced them to the world of new technologies and in 2002 they promoted PLATAFORM BL, dedicated to the creation and promotion of innovative projects and new talents.

Other projects
Bigas Luna's varied career as a filmmaker, painter and designer made him a very singular and interdisciplinary artist. An example of that is his project called "Microcosmos", an evolution of the earlier Cares de l'Ànima which was exhibited in the Galería Metropolitana de Barcelona in 1990. It can now be found on a web site (see external links below), where the visitor can modify and select the works and become, in this way, the creator.

Bigas Luna directed and produced a large-scale multimedia installation for the Spain Pavilion at Shanghai Expo 2010, named Origins, as the first part of the Pavilion's trilogy on exhibition. The installation fused live Flamenco dance, sculpture and videos on more than 20 projectors.

From 2008 to 2012, Bigas took on the art direction of the oldest musical café in Europe, El Plata, in Zaragoza (Spain). There, he created a cabaret show classified as "Cabaret Ibérico" based on parodies, eroticism, the old burlesque, etc., accompanied by the typical dishes from Spain, such as paella, ham or Spanish omelette.

Death 
Luna died of leukemia on 5 April 2013, while working on the film adaptation of Manuel de Pedrolo's novel Mecanoscrit del segon origen.

Filmography 
Tatuaje (1976), director
Historias impúdicas (1977), director
Bilbao (1978), director
Caniche  (1979), director
 (1981), director
Lola (1986), director
Anguish (1987), writer and director
Las edades de Lulú (1990), director
Jamón, jamón (1992), director
Huevos de oro (1993), director
La teta y la luna (1994), director
Lumière et compagnie (1996), director
Bámbola (1996), director
La Femme de chambre du Titanic (1997), director
Volavérunt (1999), director
Son de mar (2001), director
Yo soy la Juani (2006), director
Di Di Hollywood (2010), director

References

External links 
 
 Microcosmos
 Hanna - Film music Yo soy la Juani
  El Plata Cabaret

1946 births
2013 deaths
Film directors from Catalonia
People from Barcelona
Deaths from cancer in Spain
Deaths from leukemia